Ane or ane may refer to:

 Āne, a village in Latvia
 Ane, Netherlands, a village in Overijssel, Netherlands, also
 Battle of Ane (1227), a battle fought near the village
 -ane, a suffix in organic chemistry, or specifically
 Alkanes, which take this suffix
Aun, a mythological king of Sweden
 Ane River, a river in Shiga Prefecture, Japan

The acronym ANE may refer to:

 Ancient Near East
 The All Night Express, a wrestling stable in ROH
 Ancient North Eurasian, archaeogenetic lineage
Angers – Loire Airport, Angers, France (IATA airport code ANE)
Anoka County–Blaine Airport, Minneapolis, Minnesota, United States (FAA airport code ANE)
Anthro New England, annual furry convention in northeast America

See also 
 A&E (disambiguation)